Shamshir Rural District is a rural district (dehestan) in the Central District of Paveh County, Kermanshah Province, Iran. At the 2006 census, its population was 8,680, in 2,138 families. The rural district has 8 villages.

References 

Rural Districts of Kermanshah Province
Paveh County